Josh Holt (born 1980) is an Australian Meteorologist, Climate Specialist and Television Presenter, best known for his work at Network 10.

Biography
Holt is a qualified Meteorologist and Climate Specialist. After completing an undergraduate degree at Sydney University, Holt studied television presenting at NIDA. Holt has also completed his postgraduate university studies in climate and atmospheric sciences graduating with a distinction average.  He has also completed his postgraduate studies in meteorology graduating as a student of the Bureau of Meteorology's Graduate Meteorologist Program. 

He spent five years at the original The Weather Channel before joining Network 10 in July 2013 as the weather presenter for the Brisbane edition of Ten News at Five.

When Network 10 underwent a major restructure in 2020 which saw the production of each of the state news bulletins centralised to Sydney and Melbourne, it was initially reported that Holt had been made redundant along with his on air colleague, news presenter Georgina Lewis, with the network opting to use one national weather presenter for all bulletins.

However, it was later revealed the network would instead transfer Holt from Brisbane to Sydney where he would present the local weather forecasts on the Brisbane, Sydney and Perth editions of 10 News First while Kate Freebairn would deliver local weather forecasts for the Melbourne and Adelaide editions of 10 News First.

On the Sydney edition of 10 News First, Holt succeeded veteran weather presenter Tim Bailey who had been with the network for 30 years.  On the Perth edition of 10 News First, Holt succeeded local Perth weather presenter Michael Schultz.

While at The Weather Channel, Holt was nominated for Most Outstanding Performance by a Broadcast Journalist at the 2010 and 2012 ASTRA Awards but lost to Kieran Gilbert and David Speers, respectively, both from Sky News Australia. However, Holt was part of The Weather Channel team who won the ASTRA Award for Most Outstanding News or Coverage in 2010, for his on air live coverage during the Black Saturday bushfires.

References 

10 News First presenters
Australian television presenters
Australian meteorologists

1980 births
Living people